Pseudogekko hungkag, also known as the Bicol hollow-dwelling forest gecko, is a species of gecko. It is endemic to Bicol Peninsula of Luzon, the Philippines.

References 

Pseudogekko
Reptiles of the Philippines
Endemic fauna of the Philippines
Fauna of Luzon
Reptiles described in 2020
Taxa named by Rafe M. Brown
Taxa named by Cameron D. Siler